Calcium sulfite, or calcium sulphite, is a chemical compound, the calcium salt of sulfite with the formula CaSO3·x(H2O). Two crystalline forms are known, the hemihydrate and the tetrahydrate, respectively CaSO3·½(H2O) and CaSO3·4(H2O). All forms are white solids.  It is most notable as the product of flue-gas desulfurization.

Production 

It is produced on a large scale by flue gas desulfurization (FGD).  When coal or other fossil fuel is burned, the byproduct is known as flue gas. Flue gas often contains SO2, whose emission is often regulated to prevent acid rain.  Sulfur dioxide is scrubbed before the remaining gases are emitted through the chimney stack. An economical way of scrubbing SO2 from flue gases is by treating the effluent with Ca(OH)2 hydrated lime or CaCO3 limestone.

Scrubbing with limestone follows the following idealized reaction:
  +  →  + 
Scrubbing with hydrated lime follows the following idealized reaction:

  +  →  + 

The resulting calcium sulfite oxidizes in air to give gypsum:
  +   → 
The gypsum, if sufficiently pure, is marketable as a building material.

Uses

Drywall 
Calcium sulfite is generated as the intermediate in the production of gypsum, which is the main component of drywall. A typical US home contains 7 metric tons of such drywall gypsum board.

Food additive 
As a food additive it is used as a preservative under the E number E226. Along with other antioxidant sulfites, it is commonly used in preserving wine, cider, fruit juice, canned fruit and vegetables. Sulfites are strong reducers in solution, they act as oxygen scavenger antioxidants to preserve food, but labeling is required as some individuals might be hypersensitive.

Wood pulp production 
Chemical wood pulping is the removal of cellulose from wood by dissolving the lignin that binds the cellulose together. Calcium sulfite can be used in the production of wood pulp through the sulfite process, as an alternative to the Kraft process that uses hydroxides and sulfides instead of sulfites. Calcium sulfite was used, but has been largely replaced by magnesium and sodium sulfites and bisulfites to attack the lignin.

Gypsum 
There is a possibility to use calcium sulfite to produce gypsum by oxidizing (adding O2) it in water mixture with the manganese  (Mn2+) cation or sulfuric acid catalyzers.

Structure

The structure of calcium sulfite has been examined by X-ray crystallography.  These studies show that sulfite anion adopts its characteristic pyramidal geometry. The Ca2+ centers have high coordination numbers, being bonded to the sulfite oxygen atoms and the water, giving calcium a coordination number of eight. The tetrahydrate crystallizes as a solid solution of Ca3(SO3)2(SO4).12H2O and Ca3(SO3)2(SO3).12H2O.  The mixed sulfite-sulfate represents an intermediate in the oxidation of the sulfite to the sulfate, as is practiced in the production of gypsum. This solid solution consists of [Ca3(SO3)2(H2O)12]2+ cations and either sulfite or sulfate as the anion.

Natural occurrence
Calcium sulfite(III) hemihydrate occurs in the nature as the rare mineral hannebachite.

See also 
 Sulfite
 Magnesium sulfite
 Sodium sulfite
 Sodium bisulfite
 Sodium metabisulfite
 Campden tablet

References

Calcium compounds
Sulfites
E-number additives